The TaiwanBeer HeroBears are a Taiwanese professional basketball team based in Taipei City, Taiwan. They have competed in the T1 League since the 2021–22 season, and play their home games at the University of Taipei Tianmu Campus Gymnasium. The HeroBears became one of the six teams of the inaugural T1 League season.

In 2021, following the establishment of T1 League, Super Basketball League team Taiwan Beer basketball team splitted the team in two, which one of both joined T1 League and rebranded to TaiwanBeer HeroBears.

Home arenas 
 University of Taipei Tianmu Campus Gymnasium (2021–present) 
 Taipei Heping Basketball Gymnasium (2022)

Current roster 

<noinclude>

Personnel

General managers

Head coaches

Season-by-season record

Notable players 
Local players
  Chiang Yu-An (蔣淯安) – Chinese Taipei men's national basketball team player, SBL MVP (2019, 2020), SBL Finals MVP (2020), T1 League MVP (2022)
  Chou Po-Hsun (周伯勳) – Chinese Taipei men's national basketball team player
  Fan Shih-En (范士恩) – Chinese Taipei men's national basketball team player
  Huang Jhen (黃鎮) – Chinese Taipei men's national basketball team player
  Huang Tsung-Han (黃聰翰) – Chinese Taipei men's national basketball team player
  Lee Chi-Wei (李啟瑋) – Chinese Taipei men's national basketball team player
Type-III players
  Tyler Lamb – Thailand men's national basketball team player
Import players
  Branden Dawson – NBA player
  Cleanthony Early – NBA player
  Matt Hodgson – Australia men's national basketball team player
  Prince Ibeh – Rwanda men's national basketball team player
  Perry Jones – NBA player
  Tony Mitchell – NBA player
  Diamond Stone – NBA player
  Hasheem Thabeet – NBA player

References

External links 
 
 
 
 

 
T1 League teams
2021 establishments in Taiwan
Basketball teams established in 2021
Sport in Taipei